HD 61563 is a star in the constellation of Canis Minor. It is an optical binary with Procyon and a white giant crossing the Hertzsprung gap, however it is not actually gravitationally related to it. This is a double star system, but its components have not been individually resolved. The combined spectral type is A0III, and the combined apparent magnitude is 6.02, barely visible to the naked eye.

References

Canis Minor
A-type subgiants
Durchmusterung objects
061563
2950
Double stars
Binary stars